Bells of Doom may refer to:

 Bells of Doom (album), by Therion, 2001
 "Bells of DOOM", a song by MF Doom from the 2009 album Unexpected Guests
 Bells of Doom, a 1935 novel featuring The Shadow by Walter B. Gibson
 "The Bells of Doom", a Sexton Blake story by Donald Stuart, 1936